José de Cieza (1656–1692) was a Spanish painter.

He was the son and scholar of Miguel Geronimo de Cieza, was born at Granada. He acquired much facility in painting in distemper, and, going to Madrid in 1686, was employed to paint scenes in the theatre of Buenretiro, and became painter to the king in 1689. He likewise painted in oil historical subjects, landscapes, and flower-pieces. He died at Madrid.

Notes

References
Ansón Navarro, Arturo (1994). Signos. Arte y Cultura en Huesca. De Forment a Lastanosa. Siglos XVI-XVII. Fichas del catálogo de la exposición, p. 302-304. Huesca, Gobierno de Aragón. .
Palomino, Antonio (1988). El museo pictórico y escala óptica III. El parnaso español pintoresco laureado. Madrid, Aguilar S.A. de Ediciones. .
Pérez Sánchez, Alfonso E. (1992). Baroque Paintings in Spain, 1600-1750 Madrid, Ediciones Cátedra. .

Attribution:

External links

Some works by José de Cieza
Biography at the Museo del Prado online encyclopedia 

1656 births
1692 deaths
People from Granada
17th-century Spanish painters
Spanish male painters